"Don't Be Angry" is a popular song written by Nappy Brown, Rose Marie McCoy, and Fred Mendelsohn and published in 1955. Brown released it in 1955, reaching No. 2 on the Billboard R&B charts.  It also went to No. 25 on the US Best Seller list. 

A different song with the same title was written and made into a top 10 (No. 4) country hit in 1964 by Stonewall Jackson. It was covered by Billy "Crash" Craddock in 1973 reaching No. 33, and more successfully by Donna Fargo reaching US No. 3 in 1977 and No. 10 in Canada.

Another song of the same title was written by Walter Donaldson in the 1920s, and played as a Fox-Trot.

Cover versions 
A recording by The Crew Cuts was released by Mercury Records. It first reached the Billboard magazine charts on April 30, 1955. On the disk Jockey chart, it peaked at No. 14. On the Best Seller chart, it peaked at No. 14 and lasted 8 weeks. On the Juke Box chart, it peaked at No. 19. The flip side was "Chop Chop Boom."
A recording by American doo wop group, The Cadets, was also released in April 1955.
The song was covered by Bad Manners on their 1981 album Gosh It's... Bad Manners.
Nick Curran released a cover version of the song on his album "Doctor Velvet" on February 4, 2003.

References 

1955 singles
Donna Fargo songs
The Crew-Cuts songs
Songs written by Rose Marie McCoy
1955 songs